The Real Maestranza de Caballería de Granada (Royal Cavalry Armory of Granada) is a Spanish maestranza de caballería created in 1686 under the advocacy of the patron saint Nuestra Señora del Triunfo (Our Lady of Victory). One year later it approved a set of bylaws, and since 1992 it has been governed by state law. In 1741 it was granted the right of being led by a member of the Spanish Royal Family.

Genealogy 

 Afán de Ribera y Montero de Miranda
 Moctezuma y Aguilera-Orense
 Almansa y Gámiz
 Alvarez de las Asturias Bohorques
 Pacheco de Padilla, Altamirano, Recio-Chacón, García Callejón y Ruiz Berriz de Torres
 Verdugo, Álvarez de Bohorques, Montalvo, Abreu y Cotoner
 Pérez de Vargas y Andrada-Vanderwilde
 Carvajal y Aranda
 Baillo
 Muñoz, Bernaldo de Quiros, Borbón y Méndez de Vigo
 Cañaveral, Ponce de León, Cañas, Ruiz de Molina, López de Mendoza y Medinilla
 Carvajal y Ulloa
 Castillejo, Rubio, Márquez, Trillo Figueroa, Adán, Robles, Tortolero y Torre Marín
 Coello de Portugal y Torres Cabrera
 Contreras, San Martín y Uribe
 Chico de Guzmán
 Dávila, Ponce de León, Del Rosal, Durán, Eizmendi y Benito de Blanes
 Torres Ponce de León, Diez de Rivera y Guerrero de Torres
 Escobedo
 Fernández de Córdova y De la Puerta
 Fuentes, Fonseca y Nicuesa
 Fontes y Aguado
 Güemes, Armada y Comyn
 Heredia, Liñán, Roza y Manso
 Herrera, Fernández de Liencres, Arista y Nestares
 Ruiz Berriz de Torres, López de Mendoza, Padilla-Pacheco y Sotomayor
 Maldonado, Muñoz de Salazar, Allendesalazar y Landecho
 Martínez Carrasco y Vázquez Zafra
 Montalvo, Maza y Dávila
 Medrano, Treviño, Barreda y Corchado
 Beltrán de Caicedo, Messia de la Cerda y Prado
 Mora, González Torres de Navarra
 Narváez, Campos, Henríquez de Luna, Porcel, Andaya y López-Cuervo
 Osorio-Calvache, Arias de Morales, Montenegro y Fernández del Pino
 Pérez de Barradas, Ganada Venegas y Guiral
 Pérez de Herrasti, Robels y Yanguas
 Pérez del Pulgar
 Piñeyro
 Ponce de León, Moreno, Castro y De Montes
 Porcel, Aguirre, Corvera, Uriarte y Fernández Zapata
 Queipo de Llano
 Ramírez Tello, Toledo y Gómez de las Cortinas
 Sánchez de Teruel, Villalva, Godoy y Ansoti
 Quesada, Sanchiz, Zulueta y Brena
 Torres Ponce de León y Santa Olalla
 Serrano, Luque y Zejalbo
 Suarez de Toledo, Valderrama y Busto
 Sweertz, Campos, Mantilla de los Ríos y Fernández de Bobadilla
 Tabares, Campos, Nicuesa, Fernández de Bobadilla, Arizcun y Martos
 Cáceres, Ulloa y Orozco
 Carvajal, Ayala, Sequera, Enríquez y Valenzuela
 Varona de Alarcón, Dávila, Velázquez, Tamayo, Bilbao y Castillejo
 Velluti, Tavira, López de Ayala y Adán de Yarza
 Vereterra, peón, Duque de Estrada y Colmenares
 Villarreal y Fernández de Prada.
 Palacio, Zafra, Enciso, Fernández Tejeiro, Corvera y Godoy
 Zarate, Mora y Muñoz Cobo

External links
Real Maestranza de Caballería de Ronda
Real Maestranza de Caballería de Sevilla
Real Maestranza de Caballería de Valencia
Real Maestranza de Caballería de Zaragoza

Social history of Spain
History of Granada
1686 establishments in Spain
Organisations based in Spain with royal patronage